Area codes 415 and 628 are telephone area codes in the North American Numbering Plan (NANP) for the city of San Francisco and its northern suburbs in Marin County (across the Golden Gate), and the northeast corner of San Mateo County in the U.S. state of California. Area code 415 was one of the eighty-six original North American area codes established in 1947, but modified in geographic configuration later. Area code 628 was assigned in 2015 to form an overlay in that numbering plan area in mitigation of central office prefix exhaustion.

History
When the North American Numbering Plan was installed by AT&T for Operator Toll Dialing in 1947, the state of California was divided into three numbering plan areas (NPAs) arranged as geographical zones in the southern part, the central part, and the northern part of the state. Area code 415 was assigned to central California, south of area code 916, and north of area code 213. It stretched from Sacramento in the north to Bakersfield in the south.

In 1950, the boundaries of the numbering plan area were redrawn to produce a division of the northern and central parts along a north-south-running dividing line. Numbering plan area 415 became the coastal region from the North Coast to the Oregon border, while 916 was redrawn to comprise the northeastern corner of the state.  As part of this realignment, Sacramento was renumbered from area code 415 to 916, and Bakersfield to 213.

With the preparations for nation-wide direct distance dialing (DDD) in the early 1950s, area code 318 was temporarily used in the San Francisco area, initially by customers in Englewood, New Jersey, participating in the first customer trials to reach the city, as well as some areas north of the Golden Gate. In 1953, the entire Bay Area was "reunited" in using area code 415.

Area code 415 has been split three times due to the Bay Area's rapid economic growth and demand for telecommunication services:
 On March 1, 1959, area code 707 was created from the northern part, and area code 408 was created for San Jose, the South Bay, the Monterey Bay, and the Salinas Valley.  (408 has since been split to 831 and overlaid with 669.)
 On September 2, 1991, area code 510 was created for the East Bay, including Oakland.  (510 has since been split to 925 and was overlaid by 341 in 2019.)
 On August 2, 1997, area code 650 was created; the partition approximately followed the boundary between San Francisco, which (along with Marin County) kept 415, and San Mateo County to the south, which received the new code.  Deviations from the county line included a very small area east of the San Francisco Golf Club, which was changed to 650, and portions of Brisbane and Daly City, which remained in 415.

On February 21, 2015, the numbering plan area was transitioned to an overlay plan by adding area code 628 to the same service area for new numbers, making ten-digit dialing mandatory in the area, with eleven-digit dialing necessary from landlines.

Service area

City and County of San Francisco
San Francisco

Marin County

Bel Marin Keys
Belvedere
Black Point-Green Point
Bolinas
California Park
Corte Madera
Dogtown
Fairfax
Greenbrae
Inverness Park
Inverness
Kentfield
Lagunitas-Forest Knolls
Larkspur
Lucas Valley-Marinwood
Manor
Marconi
Marin City
Marshall
McNears Beach
Mill Valley
Muir Beach
Nicasio
Novato
Olema
Paradise Cay
Point Reyes Station
Ross
San Anselmo
San Geronimo
San Quentin
San Rafael
Santa Venetia
Sausalito
Sleepy Hollow
Stinson Beach
Strawberry
Tamalpais-Homestead Valley
Tiburon
Woodacre

San Mateo County
Brisbane
Daly City

See also
List of California area codes
List of NANP area codes

References

External links

 List of exchanges from AreaCodeDownload.com, 415 Area Code

415
Culture of San Francisco
415
Marin County, California
Northern California
Telecommunications-related introductions in 1947